Pee Wee and Peewee may refer to:

People and fictional characters
 Pee Wee (name), list of people and fictional characters with the name or nickname
 Pee Wee (singer) (born 1988), stage name of the Mexican American singer and actor Irvin Salinas

Birds
 Peewee, an alternative name in Australia for the Magpie-lark (Grallina cyanoleuca)
 Pewees, group of songbirds from the New World

Sports and games
 Peewee, youth leagues in various sports in North America:
 Peewee, a level in minor ice hockey for ages 11–12
 Pee Wee, youth leagues in American football
 Pee Wee, the youngest children’s basketball league
 Peawee, any small size of marble
 Pee-wee, an American variant of the cricket-like game gillidanda

Places

 Peewee, West Virginia, a small community in the United States
 Pee Wee Lake, a lake in California
 Pee Wee Point, a cape in West Virginia

See also
 Northern lapwing or "peewit", a European plover
 Pee Vee (disambiguation)
 Peavey (disambiguation)
 PV (disambiguation)